Shin Gyu-sik (also spelt as Shin Kyu-sik: ,  Hanja: 申圭植, February 22, 1880 - September 25, 1922) was a Korean Independence Activist who had served as a cabinet member of the Provisional Government of the Republic of Korea when Korea was under Japanese rule.

Early life 
He was born in Cheongwon County in North Chungcheong Province.  In 1899, he went to Seoul and attended the National Chinese Language School (Hanja: 漢城漢語學校).

References 

Korean politicians

1880 births
1922 deaths

Imperial Korean military personnel